The CO postcode area, also known as the Colchester postcode area, is a group of sixteen postcode districts in the east of England, within nine post towns. These cover northeast Essex (including Colchester, Bures, Clacton-on-Sea, Frinton-on-Sea, Halstead, Harwich, Manningtree and Walton-on-the-Naze) and a small part of south Suffolk (including Sudbury). 
The main sorting office is in Colchester.



Coverage
The approximate coverage of the postcode districts:

|-
! CO1
| COLCHESTER
| Colchester
| Colchester
|-
! CO2
| COLCHESTER
| Old Heath, Berechurch, Layer de la Haye
| Colchester
|-
! CO3
| COLCHESTER
| Lexden, Stanway
| Colchester
|-
! CO4
| COLCHESTER
| Greenstead, Highwoods, St Johns, Myland, Boxted, Braiswick 
| Colchester
|-
! CO5
| COLCHESTER
| Tiptree, Kelvedon, West Mersea, Peldon, Rowhedge
| Colchester, Braintree, Maldon
|-
! CO6
| COLCHESTER
| Coggeshall, Earls Colne, Marks Tey, Great Tey, Chappel, White Colne, Wakes Colne, Copford, West Bergholt, Great Horkesley, Wormingford, Nayland, Stoke-by-Nayland, Polstead
| Colchester, Braintree, Babergh
|-
! CO7
| COLCHESTER
| Brightlingsea, Wivenhoe, Great Bentley, Alresford
| Colchester, Tendring, Babergh
|-
! CO8
| BURES
| Bures, Alphamstone
| Colchester, Braintree, Babergh
|-
! CO9
| HALSTEAD
| Halstead
| Braintree 
|-
! CO10
| SUDBURY
| Sudbury
| Babergh, West Suffolk, Braintree
|-
! CO11
| MANNINGTREE
| Manningtree, Lawford, Mistley, Bradfield, Wrabness, Wix, Horsley Cross, Little Bromley, Brantham, Cattawade
| Tendring, Babergh
|-
! CO12
| HARWICH
| Harwich, Dovercourt, Parkeston, Ramsey, Little Oakley, Great Oakley, Stones Green
| Tendring
|-
! CO13
| FRINTON-ON-SEA
| Frinton-on-Sea
| Tendring
|-
! CO14
| WALTON ON THE NAZE
| Walton-on-the-Naze
| Tendring
|-
! CO15
| CLACTON-ON-SEA
| Clacton-on-Sea, Jaywick
| Tendring
|-
! CO16
| CLACTON-ON-SEA 
| Clacton-on-Sea, St Osyth, Little Clacton
| Tendring
|}

Map

See also
List of postcode areas in the United Kingdom
Postcode Address File

References

External links
Royal Mail's Postcode Address File
A quick introduction to Royal Mail's Postcode Address File (PAF)

Postcode areas covering the East of England
Borough of Colchester